Dueland or Dualand is a village in Tysvær municipality, Norway. It is located just west of the larger village of Skjoldastraumen.

History
It was previously located in Skjold municipality. On 1 January 1965, Skjold municipality was dissolved and its territory dispersed between three municipalities. The districts surrounding Yrkje, Dueland, and Grinde, with 1,133 inhabitants in total, were moved to Tysvær municipality.

People with the surname Dueland could be people from this farm, but typically people with that last name hail from a different farm called Dueland in Ølen. Several of those residents emigrated to the US; to Nebraska, Illinois and Iowa.

References

Villages in Rogaland
Tysvær